Super Size Me is a 2004 American documentary film directed by and starring Morgan Spurlock, an American independent filmmaker. Spurlock's film follows a 30-day period from February 1 to March 2, 2003, during which he ate only McDonald's food. The film documents the drastic effect on Spurlock's physical and psychological health and well-being. It also explores the fast food industry's corporate influence, including how it encourages poor nutrition for its own profit and gain.

Spurlock ate at McDonald's restaurants three times a day, eating every item on the chain's menu at least once. Spurlock consumed an average of 20.9 megajoules or 5,000 kcal (the equivalent of 9.26 Big Macs) per day during the experiment. He also walked about 2 kilometers (1.5 miles) a day. An intake of around 2,500 kcal within a healthy balanced diet is more generally recommended for a man to maintain his weight. As a result, the then-32-year-old Spurlock gained , a 13% body mass increase, increased his cholesterol to 230 mg/dL (6.0 mmol/L), and experienced mood swings, sexual dysfunction, and fat accumulation in his liver. It took Spurlock fourteen months to lose all the weight gained from his experiment using a vegan diet supervised by his then-girlfriend, a chef who specializes in gourmet vegan dishes.

The reason for Spurlock's investigation was the increasing spread of obesity throughout U.S. society, which the Surgeon General has declared an "epidemic", and the corresponding lawsuit brought against McDonald's on behalf of two overweight girls, who, it was alleged, became obese as a result of eating McDonald's food (Pelman v. McDonald's Corp., 237 F. Supp. 2d 512). Spurlock argued that, although the lawsuit against McDonald's failed (and subsequently many state legislatures have legislated against product liability actions against producers and distributors of "fast food") as well as the McLibel case, much of the same criticism leveled against the tobacco companies applies to fast food franchises whose product is both physiologically addictive and physically harmful.

The documentary was nominated for an Academy Award for Best Documentary Feature and won Best Documentary Screenplay from the Writers Guild of America. A comic book related to the movie has been made with Dark Horse Comics as the publisher containing stories based on numerous cases of fast food health scares.

Spurlock released a sequel, Super Size Me 2: Holy Chicken!, in 2017.

Synopsis
As the film begins, Spurlock is in above average physical shape according to his personal trainer. He is seen by three physicians (a cardiologist, a gastroenterologist, and a general practitioner), as well as a nutritionist and a personal trainer. All of the health professionals predict the "McDiet" will have unwelcome effects on his body, but none expected anything too drastic, one citing the human body as being "extremely adaptable". Prior to the experiment, Spurlock ate a varied diet but always had vegan evening meals to accommodate his girlfriend, Alexandra, a vegan chef.

Experiment
Spurlock followed specific rules governing his eating habits:
 He must fully eat three McDonald's meals per day: breakfast, lunch, and dinner.
 He must consume every item on the McDonald's menu at least once over the course of the 30 days (he managed this in nine days).
 He must only ingest items that are offered on the McDonald's menu, including bottled water. All outside consumption of food is prohibited.
 He must Super Size the meal if offered, but he cannot request to Super Size on his own.
 He will attempt to walk about as much as a typical United States citizen, based on a suggested figure of 5,000 standardized distance steps per day, but he did not closely adhere to this, as he walked more while in New York than in Houston.

On February 1, Spurlock starts the month with breakfast near his home in Manhattan, where there is an average of four McDonald's locations (and 66,950 residents, with twice as many commuters) per square mile (2.6 km²). He aims to keep the distances he walks in line with the 5,000 steps (approximately two miles) walked per day by the average American.

Day 2 brings Spurlock's first (of nine) Super Size meal, at the McDonald's on 34th Street and Tenth Avenue, which is a meal made of a Double Quarter Pounder with Cheese, Super Size French fries, and a 42-ounce Coca-Cola, which took him 22 minutes to eat. He experiences steadily increasing stomach discomfort during the process, and then finally vomits in the McDonald's parking lot.

After five days Spurlock has gained  (from 185.5 to about 195 pounds). It is not long before he finds himself experiencing depression, and he claims that his bouts of it along with lethargy, and headaches could be relieved by eating a McDonald's meal. His general practitioner describes him as being "addicted". Because he could only eat McDonald's food for a month, Spurlock refused to take any medication at all. At one weigh-in, Spurlock lost 1 lb. from the previous weigh-in, and a nutritionist hypothesized that he had lost muscle mass, which weighs more than an identical volume of fat. At another weigh-in, a nutritionist said that he gained  in 12 days.

Spurlock's then-girlfriend, Alexandra Jamieson, attests to the fact that Spurlock lost much of his energy and sex drive during his experiment. It was not clear at the time whether or not Spurlock would be able to complete the full month of the high-fat, high-carbohydrate diet, and family and friends began to express concern.

On Day 21, Spurlock has heart palpitations. His internist, Dr. Daryl Isaacs, advises him to stop what he is doing immediately to avoid any serious health problems. He compares Spurlock with the protagonist played by Nicolas Cage in the movie Leaving Las Vegas, who intentionally drinks himself to death in a matter of weeks. Despite this warning, Spurlock decides to continue the experiment.

On March 2, Spurlock makes it to day 30 and achieves his goal. In thirty days, he has "Supersized" his meals nine times along the way (five of which were in Texas, four in New York City). His physicians are surprised at the degree of deterioration in Spurlock's health. He notes that he has eaten as many McDonald's meals as most nutritionists say the ordinary person should eat in eight years (he ate 90 meals, which is close to the number of meals consumed once a month in an eight-year period).

Findings

The documentary's end text states that it took Spurlock five months to lose  and another nine months to lose the last . His then-girlfriend Alex, now his ex-wife, began supervising his recovery with a vegan "detox diet", which became the basis for her book, The Great American Detox Diet.

The movie ends with a rhetorical question, "Who do you want to see go first, you or them?" This is accompanied by a cartoon tombstone, which reads "Ronald McDonald (1954–2012)", which originally appeared in The Economist in an article addressing the ethics of marketing to children.

A short epilogue was added to the film. It showed that the salads can contain even more calories than burgers if the customer adds liberal amounts of cheese and dressing prior to consumption. Also, it described McDonald's discontinuation of the Super Size option six weeks after the movie's premiere, as well as its recent emphasis on healthier menu items such as salads, and the release of the new adult Happy Meal. McDonald's denied that these changes had anything to do with the film.

Reception
Super Size Me premiered at the 2004 Sundance Film Festival, where Morgan Spurlock won the Grand Jury Prize for directing the film. The film opened in the U.S. on May 7, 2004, and grossed a total of $11,536,423 worldwide, making it the 22nd highest-grossing documentary film of all time. It was nominated for an Academy Award for Best Documentary Feature, but lost to the film Born into Brothels. It did, however, win the award for Best Documentary Screenplay from the Writers Guild of America.

The film received overall positive reviews from critics and audiences. It holds a 92% "Certified Fresh" rating on the film review aggregator Rotten Tomatoes based on 171 reviews, with an average rating of 7.73/10. The consensus calls the film an "entertaining doc about the adverse effects of eating fast food." Metacritic assigned the film a weighted average score of 73 out of 100, based on 37 critics, indicating "generally favorable reviews".

Super Size Me received two thumbs up on At the Movies with Ebert and Roeper. Caroline Westbrook for BBC News stated that the hype for the documentary was proper "to a certain extent", because of its serious message, and that, overall, the film's "high comedy factor and over-familiarity of the subject matter render it less powerful than other recent documentaries – but it still makes for enjoyable, thought-provoking viewing." One reviewer said "he's telling us something everyone already knows: Fast food is bad for you."

Robert Davis of Paste said the movie accomplished some of its goals and addressed an important topic, but, at the same time, sometimes looked more like a publicity stunt than a documentary. He primarily criticized the dramatic and unscientific approach of Super Size Me, saying Spurlock unnecessarily ate more than he had to and ignored his nutritionist's advice. Davis explained he would have been more interested had the documentary been about trying to eat as healthy as possible at McDonald's: "You could choose low-fat options, but it would be impossible to get enough vegetables and fiber, and the low-fat meal would be incredibly bland, the product of a system that has worked to optimize food delivery and consistency and, in doing so, has invented foods so devoid of flavor that they require dressings, oils, beef tallow and goopy coatings to make them more than just textured blobs. The industry has worked hard to convince consumers that these odd, sweet flavors are not only good but also unique, recognizable parts of a brand. Spurlock doesn't attempt to convey this message, presumably because the affects of too few vegetables and too little fiber aren't as dramatic as speedy weight-and-cholesterol gains."

McDonald's UK responded that the author intentionally consumed an average of 5,000 calories per day and did not exercise, and that the results would have been the same regardless of the source of overeating.

Counter-claims
In his reply documentary Fat Head, Tom Naughton "suggests that Spurlock's calorie and fat counts don't add up" and noted Spurlock's refusal to publish the Super Size Me food log. The Houston Chronicle reports: "Unlike Spurlock, Naughton has a page on his Web site that lists every item (including nutritional information) he ate during his fast-food month."

After eating exclusively at McDonald's for one month, Soso Whaley said, "The first time I did the diet in April 2004, I lost 10 pounds (going from 175 to 165) and lowered my cholesterol from 237 to 197, a drop of 40 points." Of particular note was that she exercised regularly and did not insist on consuming more food than she otherwise would. Despite eating at only McDonald's every day, she maintained her caloric intake at around 2,000 per day.

After John Cisna, a high school science teacher, lost 60 pounds while eating exclusively at McDonald's for 180 days, he said, "I'm not pushing McDonald's. I'm not pushing fast food. I'm pushing taking accountability and making the right choice for you individually... As a science teacher, I would never show Super Size Me because when I watched that, I never saw the educational value in that... I mean, a guy eats uncontrollable amounts of food, stops exercising, and the whole world is surprised he puts on weight? What I'm not proud about is probably 70 to 80 percent of my colleagues across the United States still show Super Size Me in their health class or their biology class. I don't get it."

As a counterpoint, the film features interviews with Big Mac aficionado Don Gorske, who eats an average of two Big Macs a day, yet maintains his weight and cholesterol.

Impact
Six weeks after the film's debut, McDonald's discontinued its supersize portions. In the United Kingdom, McDonald's publicized a website which included a response to and criticisms of the film. In theaters in the UK, the company placed a brief ad in the film's trailers, pointing to the URL and stating, "See what we disagree with. See what we agree with."

Internationally, Super Size Me was a major success in the box office of Australia.  McDonald's in Australia responded with an advertising campaign that included three elements: two advertisements for TV and one produced to be shown in movie theaters.

The film was the inspiration for the BBC television series The Supersizers... in which the presenters dine on historical meals and take medical tests to ascertain the impact on their health.

The film was also inspiration for the 2007 documentary film Super High Me directed by Michael Blieden. The film follows Doug Benson, a comedian and cannabis enthusiast, as he becomes the subject to a multitude of tests designed to measure the physical and mental impacts of, first, not smoking cannabis for 30 days, and then smoking non-stop for 30 days. The poster for the movie was modeled after one of the promotional posters from Super Size Me.

See also

 Criticism of fast food
 National Weight Control Registry
 New York State Restaurant Association v. New York City Board of Health
 John Banzhaf
 The Supersizers..., a BBC TV series
 Fat Head, a documentary
 Super High Me, a documentary
 Fast Food Nation

References

External links

 
 
 
 

2000s American films
2000s English-language films
2004 directorial debut films
2004 documentary films
2004 films
2004 independent films
American business films
American documentary films
American films with live action and animation
American independent films
Criticism of fast food
Documentary films about business
Documentary films about consumerism
Documentary films about food and drink
Documentary films about McDonald's
Documentary films about obesity
Films directed by Morgan Spurlock
Films shot in California
Films shot in Illinois
Films shot in New York City
Films shot in North Carolina
Films shot in Texas
Films shot in Washington, D.C.
Films shot in West Virginia
Films shot in Wisconsin
Roadside Attractions films
Sundance Film Festival award winners